Wesford Grenoble Graduate Business School was created in 1987 in Grenoble, Lyon and Geneva, France. It claims to be the first business school in the area to provide part-time classes. Alex Lienard is Dean and President of the faculty. Originally located close to the University of Grenoble, it later moved to the city centre.

The school is certified ISO 9001 and by the ICPC (International Council for Professional Competences) for quality and professionalism.

The motto of the schoolLatin: Feliciter Eveniendi Facultas (The Faculty Needed to Succeed)

The crest of the school The book of knowledge is opened on the coat of the Dauphiné. The dagger protects the knowledge from the ignorants or beotians. Laurel leaf for success, oak leaf for wisdom.

External links
Wesford Graduate Business School

Business schools in France
Educational institutions in Grenoble
Educational institutions established in 1987
1987 establishments in France